Muza  is a village in the administrative district of Gmina Puck, within Puck County, Pomeranian Voivodeship, in northern Poland. Gdańsk.

For details of the history of the region, see History of Pomerania.

References

Muza